The men's tournament of volleyball at the 2011 Summer Universiade at Shenzhen, China began on August 12 and ended on August 22.

Teams

Preliminary round

Group A

|}

|}

Group B

|}

|}

Group C

|}

|}

Group D

|}

|}

Quarterfinal Round

Classification 17-21 places

|}

Classification 9-16 places

|}

Quarterfinals

|}

Semifinal Round

Classification 17-20 places

|}

Classification 13-16 places

|}

Classification 9-12 places

|}

Classification 5-8 places

|}

Semifinals

|}

Final round

19th place

|}

17th place

|}

15th place

|}

13th place

|}

11th place

|}

9th place

|}

7th place

|}

5th place

|}

Bronze medal match

|}

Gold Medal match

|}

Final standings

External links
Schedule
Reports

Volleyball at the 2011 Summer Universiade